The IQA World Cup VI was the 2013 edition of the IQA World Cup (now the US Quidditch Cup), a quidditch club tournament then organized by the International Quidditch Association.
The tournament was hosted in Kissimmee, Florida from April 13–14, 2013.

The Cup featured 77 teams from 4 countries. Sixty of the teams competed in the D1 division, and 17 teams competed in the D2 division. The D1 winner was University of Texas, who defeated UCLA in the championship match.  This marked the first time that Middlebury College did not win the Cup. The D2 division was won by Sam Houston State University who defeated Loyola University New Orleans, making the championships an all-Texas affair.

Due to the increasingly large number of official member teams, Division 1 was not open to all comers and was limited to 60 teams who earned their spot in the World Cup by competing in regional tournaments. Division 2 consisted of other official teams who did not earn their spot at regionals but still wanted to compete.

D1 division

Qualifying teams 

World
Paris Phénix (Paris, France)
Tec Quidditch (Monterrey, Mexico)
Qwertryians Tijuana (Tijuana, Mexico)

Eastern Canada
Fleming College (Peterborough, Ontario)
University of Ottawa (Ottawa, Ontario)
University of Toronto (Toronto, Ontario)

United States - Mid-Atlantic Division
Johns Hopkins University (Baltimore, Maryland)
Penn State University (State College, Pennsylvania)
QC Carolinas (Winston-Salem, North Carolina)
QC Pittsburg (Pittsburgh, Pennsylvania)
University of Maryland (College Park, Maryland)
University of Richmond (Richmond, Virginia)
Villanova University (Philadelphia, Pennsylvania)
Virginia Commonwealth University (Richmond, Virginia)

United States - Midwest Division
Ball State University (Muncie, Indiana)
Bowling Green State University (Bowling Green, Ohio)
Central Michigan University (Mt. Pleasant, Michigan) 
Illinois State University (Normal, Illinois)
University of Kansas (Lawrence, Kansas)
Loyola University Chicago (Chicago, Illinois)
Marquette University (Milwaukee, Wisconsin)
Michigan State University (East Lansing, Michigan)
Ohio State University (Columbus, Ohio)
Purdue University (West Lafayette, Indiana)
University of Michigan (Ann Arbor, Michigan)
University of Minnesota (Minneapolis, Minnesota)

United States - Northeast Region
Boston Riot (Boston, Massachusetts)
Boston University (Boston, Massachusetts)
Emerson College (Boston, Massachusetts)
Hofstra University (Hempstead, New York)
Macaulay Honors College (New York, New York)
New York University (New York, New York)
Rochester Institute of Technology (Rochester, New York)
SUNY Geneseo (Geneseo, New York)
Tufts University (Boston, Massachusetts)
University of Massachusetts (Amherst, Massachusetts)
University of Rochester (Rochester, New York)

United States - South Region
Florida State University (Tallahassee, Florida)
Tennessee Tech University (Cookeville, Tennessee)
University of Florida (Gainesville, Florida)
University of Miami (Miami, Florida)
University of South Florida (Tampa, Florida)
University of Southern Mississippi (Hattiesburg, Mississippi)

United States - Southwest Region
Austin Quidditch (Austin, Texas)
Baylor University (Waco, Texas)
LSU (Baton Rouge, Louisiana)
Oklahoma State University (Stillwater, Oklahoma)
Roadrunner Quidditch (UTSA) (San Antonio, Texas)
Silver Phoenix (College Station, Texas)
Texas A&M University (College Station, Texas)
University of Arkansas (Fayetteville, Arkansas)
University of Texas (Austin, Texas)

United States - West Region
Arizona State University (Phoenix, Arizona)
Lost Boys (Los Angeles, California)
Northern Arizona University (Flagstaff, Arizona)
Silicon Valley Skrewts (Mountain View, California)
University of California, Berkeley (Berkeley, California)
University of California, Los Angeles (Los Angeles, California)
University of Southern California (Los Angeles, California)

Format 

The format of the Cup was pool play, followed by a 36-team bracket. The 60 teams were divided into 12 pools of 5 teams each. Each team played the 4 other teams in their pool, and the top 3 teams from each pool advanced to the 36-team bracket.

Pools 

Pool 1

Pool 2

Pool 3

Pool 4

Pool 5

Pool 6

Note: Northern Arizona defeated Ottawa head-to-head to win the bracket

Pool 7

Pool 8

Pool 9

Pool 10

Pool 11

Pool 12

Bracket 

The 36 teams advancing from pool play were seeded 1 through 36. Seeds 29-36 played in four games to arrive at the final 32 teams, from which a standard elimination bracket ensued.
35 Seed RIT defeated 36 Seed USF to face UCLA in the first round.
30 Seed Arizona State defeated 29 Seed Villanova to face Boston University in the first round.
31 Seed Bowling Green defeated 32 Seed Tennessee Tech to face University of Miami in the first round.
33 Seed Virginia Commonwealth defeated 34 Seed Tufts to face University of Texas in the first round.

D2 division

Teams entered 
Brevard Community College (Brevard County, Florida)
CAMPS Quidditch (Bridgewater, Massachusetts)
College of Charleston (Charleston, South Carolina)
Florida Atlantic University (Boca Raton, Florida)
Loyola University (NO) (New Orleans, Louisiana)
Miami University (Oxford, Ohio)
NY Badassilisks (New York, New York)
Rice University (Houston, Texas)
Ringling College of Art and Design (Sarasota, Florida)
Sam Houston State University (Huntsville, Texas)
Stanford University (Stanford, California)
Syracuse University (Syracuse, New York)
University of Central Florida (Orlando, Florida)
University of South Alabama (Mobile, Alabama)
University of South Carolina (Columbia, South Carolina)
University of Toledo (Toledo, Ohio)
Winthrop University (Rock Hill, South Carolina)

Format 

The format of the D2 division was pool play, followed by a 12-team bracket. The 17 teams were divided into 4 pools - 3 with 4 teams each, and 1 pool with 5 teams. Each team played the 3 or 4 other teams in their pool, and the top 3 teams from each pool moved on to the 12-team bracket. Within the bracket, the top 4 seeds got a vie into the second round, and seeds 5-12 played the opening round games.

Pools 

Pool 1

Pool 2

Pool 3

Pool 4

Bracket

See also

 Muggle quidditch
 International Quidditch Association

References

IQA World Cup
US Quidditch Cup
2013 in American sports
Sports in Kissimmee, Florida
Sports competitions in Florida
April 2013 sports events in the United States
Events in Kissimmee, Florida